PowerWash Simulator is a simulation video game developed by FuturLab and published by Square Enix Collective. The game was first made available in early access through Steam on 19 May 2021, and was fully released for Microsoft Windows, Xbox One, and Xbox Series X/S on 14 July 2022. Further ports for the Nintendo Switch, PlayStation 4 and PlayStation 5, were for a 31 January 2023 release. Players take control of a power washing business and complete various jobs to earn money. Gameplay primarily revolves around using a power washer to clean dirt off of objects and buildings.

Gameplay 
PowerWash Simulator is a simulation game played in the first-person perspective. Set in the town of Muckingham, players take control of a small power washing business and take jobs for a variety of clients in different locations in the form of levels. Players must remove dirt from various objects, ranging from residential houses to a Mars rover, to complete each level. Successfully cleaning an object will grant the player money, which can then be used to upgrade their power washing tools. These upgrades allow the player to customise their power washer to be more effective at certain ranges or in certain situations. The player can also use additional tools, like a ladder which can reach different areas of a level. Two expansions themed after other video game franchises have been released as free downloadable content: one based on Tomb Raider on January 31, 2023, and one based on Final Fantasy VII Remake on March 2, 2023.

Reception

Pre-release 
Cass Marshall of Polygon praised the game for its casual gameplay, writing that it "[captures] the most relaxing bits of home care with none of the hassle." Jordan Devore of Destructoid also praised the game for its "robust" gameplay, but noted that slight issues were present in the game's demo, including walking on slopes and finishing the last portion of levels. Gabriel Zamora of PCMag similarly gave praise to the satisfying gameplay loop, relaxing game feel, variety of items to clean, and "terrific" graphical style and presentation but took issue with the "poorly implemented" soap system, "unnatural" water and dirt simulation, "bland" sound, and "sluggish" character movement.

Critical reception 
PowerWash Simulator received "generally favorable" reviews according to review aggregator Metacritic, but received "mixed or average" reviews for the Windows version.

Ed Thorn of Rock Paper Shotgun praised the game's career mode, zen-like gameplay feel, variety of substantial modes, and addition of online co-op, but criticised the pacing of some jobs, concluding, "...issues with the game are small in comparison with the true satisfaction and serene spaces it provides...It's not overly complex, doesn't take itself too seriously, and still has plenty of depth for those who just want to hose down a bungalow." Fraser Gilbert of Pure Xbox gave the title 8/10 stars and appreciated its intuitive gameplay, leisurely pace, variety of modes, and inclusion of online co-op while noting its repetitive nature and lack of a proper soundtrack.

References

External links

2022 video games
Early access video games
Nintendo Switch games
PlayStation 4 games
PlayStation 5 games
Simulation video games
Video games developed in the United Kingdom
Windows games
Xbox One games
Xbox Series X and Series S games